Fionn Griffiths (born 27 of August 1982, Shrewsbury, Shropshire) is a female British downhill mountain bike rider. She has won 19 Downhill and 4X world cups and stood on 57 World Cup podiums over the 18 years of her career. Fionn founded and ran GR Management a successful sports marketing agency in 2001 specialised in sports marketing - team, Athlete and event management. Over her career she has owned and run multiple World Cup teams: The NORCO World Team, GR Orange, GR INTENSE, GR Evil bringing overall team podium finishes in the UCI (Union Cycliste Internationale) Elite Team standings as well as representing many athletes in a management capacity. Over the years her athletes and teams have won multiple world championships and World Cup events across a range of sports. Fionn herself is a two time world cup champion, Fionn holds 2 bronze and 3 silverworld championship medals as well as being a five time UK national champion in her discipline of DH. She has also competed on the GB team for off road motorcycle racing for a number of years and holds European Enduro champion title in this discipline  As of 2019 she is the holder of 57x UCI World Cup Podiums.

In 2015 Fionn ended her race career prematurely when she landed a jump awkwardly (Fort William World Cup) resulting in a compression fracture of her lower spine for which later required a fusion surgery.

Following injury she moved to Asolo in Italy where she worked with her long time sponsor Alpinestars to design and develop their technician MX and Mountain Bike product lines.

Her passion for sports marketing saw her move back to the UK in 2017 where she took a position with Husqvarna Motorcycles as the National Marketing and Events coordinator. 

And after seeking a career in 2021 with the same level of excitement, danger and unknown as she experienced throughout her career as an international athlete she is currently a UK Firefighter serving local communities in the West Midlands area.

History

Fionn first got into mountain biking when she had a car accident and used it as help for her injuries sustained from the crash. She then continued to bike and when to a local training day and picked up her first race entry form, from Mid Shropshire Wheelers.

In 2011 she won the 4X World cup and came fifth in the UCL standings with the all female team she put together.
The end of her career would come in 2015 at the Fort William World Cup when she broke her L5 into 3 pieces during a practice run. She has now undergone a spinal fusion (L4/L5/S1) and nerve depression surgery. 
  

Over her career she set up and ran a number of world cup UCI teams starting with The NORCO World Team , Intense and then KTM.

Injuries

In 2004 Fionn Griffiths broke her ankle at the start of the season. In an interview with BBC Wales she talked about the incident: "It was one of the biggest mistakes I've ever made. I'm only now beginning to realize how to mentally put myself back together." She ended up breaking her ankle 7 times in a year and a half after trying to continue her race season despite her injuries. over her career she also sustained other multiple major injuries including, concussions, broken wrists, hip injury, fractured neck, fractured thoracic spine, multiple dislocated shoulders, ribs and fingers and Internal bleeding. 
The end of her career would come in 2015 at the Fort William World Cup when she broke her L5 into 3 pieces during a practice run. She has now undergone a spinal fusion (L4/L5/S1) and nerve depression surgery.

References

English mountain bikers
1982 births
Living people
Downhill mountain bikers